Suphan Buri (literally "City of Gold") may refer to:

 Suphan Buri Province, a province of Thailand
 Mueang Suphan Buri District, the capital district of Suphan Buri Province
 Suphan Buri, a town in Suphan Buri Province
 Tha Chin River, also known as Suphan Buri River